Sreedevi Unni is an Indian Mohiniyattam dancer and actress best known for her work in the Malayalam cinema and TV serials. She is the mother of Monisha Unni.

Filmography

TV serials

Albums
 Ammakkayi
 Thilodakam

TV Shows
 Arangettam
 Charutha
 Tharapakittu
 Pularvela
 Vanitha
 Varthaprabhatham
 Comedy Stars
 Malayali Darbar
 Ammamarude Samsthana Sammelanam
 Straight Line
 Red Carpet

References

External links
 IMDb
m3db

Indian female classical dancers
Bharatanatyam exponents
Performers of Indian classical dance
Kerala State Film Award winners
Artists from Bangalore
Actresses in Malayalam cinema
Living people
21st-century Indian actresses
Actresses in Kannada cinema
Indian film actresses
Actresses from Bangalore
Dancers from Karnataka
20th-century Indian dancers
21st-century Indian dancers
Indian television actresses
Actresses in Malayalam television
20th-century Indian women
1945 births